In organometallic chemistry, a transition metal indenyl complex is a coordination compound that contains one or more indenyl ligands.  The indenyl ligand is formally the anion derived from deprotonation of indene. The η5-indenyl ligand is related to the η5cyclopentadienyl anion (Cp), thus indenyl analogues of many cyclopentadienyl complexes are known.  Indenyl ligands lack the 5-fold symmetry of Cp, so they exhibit more complicated geometries.  Furthermore, some indenyl complexes also exist with only η3-bonding mode.  The η5- and η3-bonding modes sometimes interconvert.

Preparation and structure
Indene is deprotonated by butyl lithium and related reagents to give the equivalent of the indenyl anion:
C9H8  +  BuLi  →  LiC9H7  +  BuH
The resulting lithium indenide can be used to prepare indenyl complexes by salt metathesis reactions of metal halides.  When the metal halide is easily reduced, the trimethylstannylindenyl can be used as a source of indenyl anion:
Me3SnC9H7  +  TiCl4   →   Me3SnCl  +  C9H7TiCl3

The M-C distances in indenyl complexes are comparable to those in cyclopentadienyl complexes.  For the metallocenes M(Ind)2, ring slipping is evident for the case of M = Co and especially Ni, but not for M = Fe.  A number of chelating or ansa-bis(indenyl complexes are known, such as those derived from 2,2'-bis(2-indenyl) biphenyl

Indenyl effect
The indenyl effect refers to an explanation for the enhanced rates of substitution exhibited by η5-indenyl complexes vs the related η5-cyclopentadienyl complexes.

Associative substitution occurs by the addition of a ligand to a metal complex followed by dissociation of an original ligand. Associative pathways are not typically seen in 18-electron complexes due to the requisite intermediates having more than 18 electrons associated with the metal atom.  18 electron indenyl complexes; however, have been shown to undergo substitution via associative pathways quite readily.  This is attributed to the relative ease of η5 to η3 rearrangement due to stabilization by the arene.  This stabilization is responsible for substitution rate enhancements of about 108 for the substitution of indenyl complexes compared to the corresponding cyclopentadienyl complex.

Kinetic data support two proposed mechanisms for associative ligand substitution.  The first mechanism, proposed by Hart-Davis and Mawby, is a concerted attack by the nucleophile and η5 to η3 transition followed by loss of a ligand and a η3 to η5 transition.

In a mechanism proposed by Basolo, η5 and η3 isomers exist in rapid chemical equilibrium.  The rate-limiting step occurs with the attack of the nucleophile on a η3 isomer. The nature of the substituents of the allyl group can strongly affect the kinetics and regiochemistry of the nucleophilic attack.

η5 to η3 rearrangement in other ligands
Indenyl like effects are also observed in a number of non indenyl substituted metal complexes.  In fluorenyl complexes, associative substitution is enhanced even further than indenyl compounds.  The substitution rate of Mn(η5-C13H9)(CO)3 is about 60 times faster than that of Mn(η5-C9H7)(CO)3

Veiros conducted a study comparing the rate of substitution on [(η5-X)Mn(CO)3] where X is cyclopentadienyl, indenyl, fluorenyl, cyclohexadienyl, and 1-hydronaphthalene.  Unsurprisingly, it was found that the ease of η5 to η3 haptotropic shift correlated to the strength of the Mn-X bond.

History
The indenyl analogues of ferrocene, which is orange, and cobaltocenium cation were first reported by Pauson and Wilkinson.  The cobalt derivative is a poorer reductant than cobaltocene.

The indenyl effect was discovered by Hart-Davis and Mawby in 1969 through studies on the conversion of (η5-C9H7)Mo(CO)3CH3 to the phosphine-substituted acetyl complex, which follows bimolecular kinetics. This rate law was attributed to the haptotropic rearrangement of the indenyl ligand from η5 to η3.  The corresponding reaction of tributylphosphine with (η5-C5H5)Mo(CO)3CH3 was 10 x slower. The term indenyl effect was coined by Fred Basolo.

Subsequent work by Hart-Davis, Mawby, and White compared CO substitution by phosphines in Mo(η5-C9H7)(CO)3X and Mo(η5-C5H5)(CO)3X (X = Cl, Br, I) and found the cyclopentadienyl compounds to substitute by an SN1 pathway and the indenyl compounds to substitute by both SN1 and SN2 pathways.  Mawby and Jones later studied the rate of CO substitution with P(OEt)3 with Fe(η5-C9H7)(CO)2I and Fe(η5-C5H5)(CO)2I and found that both occur by an SN1 pathway with the indenyl substitution occurring about 575 times faster. Hydrogenation of the arene ring in the indenyl ligand resulted in CO substitution at about half the rate of the cyclopentadienyl compound.

Work in the early 1980s by Basolo found the SN2 replacement of CO in Rh(η5-C9H7)(CO)2 to be 108 times faster than in Rh(η5-C5H5)(CO)2.  Shortly afterwards, Basolo tested the effect of the indene ligand on Mn(η5-C9H7)(CO)3, the cyclopentadienyl analogue of which having been shown to be inert to CO substitution.  Mn(η5-C9H7)(CO)3 did undergo CO loss and was found to substitute via an SN2 mechanism.

References

Organometallic chemistry
Reaction mechanisms